A24 is an independent pan-African production studio, an 'African voice for Africa', based in Nairobi, Kenya. It started operations on 13 May 2008.

Overview
The project is the brainchild of Salim Amin and Asif Sheikh, Salim is a Kenyan photojournalist and entrepreneur based in Nairobi who runs Camerapix, the media business started by his late father Mohammed 'Mo' Amin.

The channel's model for development is the Al Jazeera network in Qatar. As well as providing news, A24's mission is to communicate relevant information about cross-border issues especially health care, the environment, business, art, and music, without shirking from addressing the continent's problems. Salim Amin wrote in an article: "We are different in each corner of Africa; we have different histories, cultures and many different languages. But we need to talk to each other, we need to understand all these differences, we need to share our successes, and jointly fight our problems and failures - many of which are similar - HIV, malaria, corruption, poverty, human rights and education."

Programming

Series
 God in Africa
 Family Doctor
 CrossTalk
 Witness (licensed from Al-Jazeera English)
 Shake
 Kuwa Tofauti
 Hatua
 Doctors on Call
 Nigeria This Week
 Kaleidoscope
 Business 2010
 Business in Africa
 East Africa Report
 Africa's Entrepreneurs
 Healthy Business
 Initiavtive Africa (produced by People TV)
 Business Africa (produced by People TV)

External links
 A24 Media
 A24 photography

References

Television stations in Kenya
24-hour television news channels
Television channels and stations established in 2008
Mass media in Nairobi